Elfriede Hammerl (born 29 April 1945) is an Austrian journalist and writer from Gumpoldskirchen, near Vienna.

Life 

She has written and continues to write columns for a wide variety of newspapers, journals and magazines (including for Kurier, Stern, Profil, Vogue, and Cosmopolitan).

She has also written plays, cabaret texts, short stories, screenplays and novels.

Hammerl was a co-initiator of the Austrian women's referendum in April 1997, she stood as a candidate in the 1999 Austrian legislative election for the Liberal Forum and was a member of the non-university advisory board of the University of Innsbruck from 2000 to 2002.

Awards 
 1999 Preis der Stadt Wien für Publizistik
 2002 Wiener Frauenpreis
 2003 Concordia-Preis in the Human Rights category
 2006 
 2006 
 2011 Kurt-Vorhofer-Preis
 2011 .
 2015 Frauenring-Preis.
 2016 Decoration of Honour for Services to the Republic of Austria.
 2016 Österreichischer Journalist des Jahres – Award for her life's work.
 2017 Käthe Leichter Prize of the Federal Ministry of Health and Women.
 2018 Concordia-Preis for her life's work.

Works 
 Das muss gesagt werden Kolumnen. Kremayr & Scheriau 2020, 
 Alte Geschichten: Erzählungen. Kremayr & Scheriau 2018, 
 Von Liebe und Einsamkeit. Kremayr & Scheriau 2016, 
 Hotel Mama – Nesthocker, Nervensägen und Neurosen. Zsolnay 2007, 
 Müde bin ich Känguru – Leben in der Patchwork-Familie. Zsolnay 2006, 
 Der verpasste Mann. Deuticke 2004, 
 Wunderbare Valerie. Deuticke 2003, 
 Mausi oder Das Leben ist ungerecht. Deuticke 2002; TB Piper 
 Steile Typen im Supermarkt / oder Die Hausfrau braucht Herausforderungen. Ueberreuter 1998
 Hunde – Kleine Philosophie der Passionen. dtv 1997, 
 Schuldgefühle sind schön. Beobachtungen des Katers Ferdinand. 1992; Neuauflage Deuticke 2003,

References

External links 

 
 
 Radio portrait of Elfriede Hammerl in the Ö1-Sendereihe "Chronisten, Reporter, Aufklärer" aus dem Jahr 2002

1945 births
Living people
20th-century Austrian journalists
21st-century Austrian journalists
Austrian women journalists
Austrian women writers
People from Weiz District